Usha R. Rodrigues is an American legal scholar working as the M.E. Kilpatrick Chair of Corporate Finance and Securities Law at the University of Georgia School of Law.

Early life and education 
Rodrigues is a native of Potomac, Maryland. She earned a Bachelor of Arts degree in English from Georgetown University, Master of Arts in comparative literature from University of Wisconsin–Madison, and Juris Doctor from the University of Virginia School of Law.

Career 
Rodrigues served as a law clerk for Judge Thomas L. Ambro. From 2002 to 2005, she worked as an associate at Wilson Sonsini Goodrich & Rosati. She joined the University of Georgia School of Law in 2009 and became the M.E. Kilpatrick Chair of Corporate Finance and Securities Law in 2014. In 2022, Rodrigues was selected to serve as the interim vice provost of the University of Georgia for academic affairs. Her scholarship focuses on corporate law, business ethics, and United States securities regulation. Rodrigues has also been cited as an expert in special-purpose acquisition companies.

References

American lawyers
Year of birth missing (living people)
Living people

People from Potomac, Maryland
Georgetown University alumni
University of Wisconsin–Madison alumni
University of Virginia School of Law alumni
University of Georgia faculty